Robert Hedges may refer to:

Robert Hedges (colonial administrator), President of Bengal, 1713–1718
Robert Hedges (baseball) (1869–1932), American baseball team owner
Robert E. M. Hedges, British archaeologist
Robert Yorke Hedges (1903–1963), British expatriate judge who was Chief Justice of Sarawak from 1946 to 1951
Robbie Hedges, chief of the Peoria tribe of Indians of Oklahoma